Peter Grabowski is a retired slalom canoeist who competed for East Germany in the 1970s. He won a bronze medal in the C-2 team event at the 1973 ICF Canoe Slalom World Championships in Muotathal.

References

German male canoeists
Year of birth missing (living people)
Possibly living people
Medalists at the ICF Canoe Slalom World Championships